Ugo Foscolo (6 February 177810 September 1827), born Niccolò Foscolo, was an Italian writer, revolutionary and a poet.

He is especially remembered for his 1807 long poem Dei Sepolcri.

Early life
Foscolo was born in Zakynthos in the Ionian Islands. His father Andrea Foscolo was an impoverished Venetian nobleman, and his mother Diamantina Spathis was Greek.

In 1788, upon the death of his father, who worked as a physician in Spalato (present-day Split, Croatia), the family moved to Venice, and Foscolo completed the studies he began at the Dalmatian grammar school at the University of Padua.

Amongst his Paduan teachers was the Abbé Melchiore Cesarotti, whose version of Ossian was very popular in Italy, and who influenced Foscolo's literary tastes; he knew both modern and Ancient Greek. His literary ambition revealed itself in the appearance in 1797 of his tragedy Tieste—a production that enjoyed a certain degree of success.

Politics and poetry
Foscolo, who, for unknown reasons, had changed his Christian name Niccolò to that of Ugo, began to take an active part in the stormy political discussions which the fall of the Republic of Venice had triggered off. He was a prominent member of the national committees, and addressed an ode to Napoleon, expecting Napoleon to overthrow the Venetian oligarchy and create a free republic.

The Treaty of Campo Formio (17 October 1797) meant the definitive end to the ancient Republic of Venice, which was disbanded and partitioned by the French. The Austrians gave a rude shock to Foscolo, but did not quite destroy his hopes. The state of mind produced by that shock is reflected in his novel The Last Letters of Jacopo Ortis (1798), which was described by the 1911 Encyclopædia Britannica as a more politicized version of Johann Wolfgang von Goethe's The Sorrows of Young Werther, "for the hero of Foscolo embodies the mental sufferings and suicide of an undeceived Italian patriot just as the hero of Goethe places before us the too delicate sensitiveness embittering and at last cutting short the life of a private German scholar."

The story of Foscolo's novel, The Last Letters of Jacopo Ortis had a groundwork of melancholy fact. Jacopo Ortis had been a real person; he was a young student from Padua, and committed suicide there under circumstances akin to those described by Foscolo.

Foscolo, like many of his contemporaries, had thought much about suicide. Cato the Younger and the many classical examples of self-destruction described in Plutarch's Lives appealed to the imaginations of young Italian patriots as they had done in France to those of the heroes and heroines of the Gironde. In the case of Foscolo, as in that of Goethe, the effect produced on the writer's mind by the composition of the work seems to have been beneficial. He had seen the ideal of a great national future rudely shattered; but he did not despair of his country, and sought relief in now turning to gaze on the ideal of a great national poet.

After the fall of Venice Foscolo moved to Milan, where he formed a friendship with the older poet Giuseppe Parini, whom he later remembered with admiration and gratitude. In Milan, he published a choice of 12 Sonnets, where he blends the passionate sentiments shown in Ortis with classical control of language and rhythm.

Still hoping that his country would be freed by Napoleon, he served as a volunteer in the French army, took part in the battle of the Trebbia and the siege of Genoa, was wounded and made prisoner. When released he returned to Milan, and there gave the last touches to his Ortis, published a translation of and commentary upon Callimachus, commenced a version of the Iliad and began his translation of Laurence Sterne's A Sentimental Journey Through France and Italy. He also took part in a failed memorandum intended to present a new model of unified Italian government to Napoleon.

 

Before leaving France in 1806, Foscolo met Alessandro Manzoni once again, who was only seven years younger, in Paris. Manzoni was still living here in the house of his mother Giulia Beccaria. Some studies have compared the poetic production of Foscolo and Manzoni in the period from 1801 till 1803, with very close analogies (textual, metric and biographic) like in Alla amica risanata, ode to Antonietta Fagnani Arese, and Qual su le cinzie cime.

In 1807, Foscolo wrote his Dei Sepolcri, which may be described as a sublime effort to seek refuge in the past from the misery of the present and the darkness of the future. The mighty dead are summoned from their tombs, as ages before they had been in the masterpieces of Greek oratory, to fight again the battles of their country. The inaugural lecture On the origin and duty of literature, delivered by Foscolo in January 1809 when appointed to the chair of Italian eloquence at Pavia, was conceived in the same spirit. In this lecture Foscolo urged his young countrymen to study literature, not in obedience to academic traditions, but in their relation to individual and national life and growth. In Pavia Foscolo lived in Palazzo Cornazzani, in the same building, curiously, then Contardo Ferrini, Ada Negri and Albert Einstein also lived.

The sensation produced by this lecture had no slight share in provoking the decree of Napoleon by which the chair of national eloquence was abolished in all the Italian universities. Soon afterwards, Foscolo's tragedy of Ajax was presented, with little success, at Milan, and because of its supposed allusions to Napoleon, he was forced to move from Milan to Tuscany. The chief fruits of his stay in Florence are the tragedy of Ricciarda, the Ode to the Graces, left unfinished, and the completion of his version of the Sentimental Journey (1813), having covered much of the ground covered by its main character the Reverend Yorick thanks to his time at the Boulogne-sur-Mer camp as part of Napoleon's invasion force against Britain. In his memoir of Didimo Chierico, to whom the version is dedicated, Foscolo throws much light on his own character. His version of Sterne is an important feature in his personal history.

Foscolo returned to Milan in 1813, until the entry of the Austrians; from there he passed into Switzerland, where he wrote a fierce satire in Latin on his political and literary opponents; and finally he sought the shores of England at the close of 1816.

London

During the eleven years spent by Foscolo in London, until his death there, he enjoyed all the social distinction which the most brilliant circles of the English capital could confer on foreigners of political and literary renown, and experienced all the misery which follows on from a disregard of the first conditions of domestic economy.

His contributions to the Edinburgh Review and Quarterly Review, his dissertations in Italian on the text of Dante Alighieri and Giovanni Boccaccio, and still more his English essays on Petrarch, of which the value was enhanced by Barbarina Brand's admirable translations of some of Petrarch's finest sonnets, heightened his previous fame as a Man of Letters. However, he was frequently accused of financial ineptitude, and ended up spending time in debtors' prison, which affected his social standing after his release.

According to the History of the County of Middlesex, the scientist and businessman William Allen hired Foscolo to teach Italian at the Quaker school he co-founded, the Newington Academy for Girls. His general bearing in society – as reported by Walter Scott – had not been such as to gain and retain lasting friendships. He died at Turnham Green on 10 September 1827, and was buried at St Nicholas Church, Chiswick, where his restored tomb remains to this day; it refers to him as the "wearied citizen poet", and incorrectly states his age as 50. Forty-four years after his death, on 7 June 1871, his remains were exhumed at the request of the King of Italy and taken to Florence, where with all the pride, pomp and circumstance of a great national mourning, found their final resting-place beside the monuments of Niccolò Machiavelli and Vittorio Alfieri, of Michelangelo and Galileo, in the church of Santa Croce, the pantheon of Italian glory he had celebrated in Dei Sepolcri.

As noted by historian Lucy Riall, the glorification of Ugo Foscolo in the 1870s was part of the effort of the Italian government of this time (successful in completing the Italian unification but at the cost of a head-on confrontation with the Catholic Church) to create a gallery of "secular saints" to compete with those of the Church and sway popular feeling in favor of the newly created Italian state.

References in modern culture
 Ugo Foscolo is the subject of a composition, La fuga di Foscolo, written in 1986 by Italian composer Lorenzo Ferrero.
 His sonnet "Alla sera" appears in the movie La meglio gioventù.
 His house in Edwardes Square in Kensington, west London, has an English Heritage blue plaque.

Works

Poetry
 A Bonaparte liberatore [To Bonaparte the liberator] (1797) 
 All'amica risanata (1802)
 Alla Musa (1803)
 Alla sera (1803) 
 A Zacinto [To Zakinthos] (1803)
 In morte del fratello Giovanni (1803)
 Dei Sepolcri [Of the sepulchres] (1807)

Novels
 Ultime lettere di Jacopo Ortis (1802) The Last Letters of Jacopo Ortis
 Il sesto tomo dell'Io (unfinished, undated)

Plays
 Tieste (1797) [Thyestes]
 Aiace (1811)

References

External links 
 
 
 
 
 
 Works in Italian: Ugo Foscolo Project, IntraText Digital Library, Prose works, ed. Cian, Laterza, 1912–1920,
 Texts of Foscolo and chronology,
 Works in Italian: Cesare Angelini, "I giorni del Foscolo a Pavia" / "Days of Foscolo in Pavia"

1778 births
1827 deaths
Italian male poets
18th-century Italian poets
19th-century Italian poets
19th-century Italian male writers
Italian people of Greek descent
Italian emigrants to the United Kingdom
People from Zakynthos
Burials at Basilica of Santa Croce, Florence
18th-century Italian male writers
Italian exiles
18th-century Italian dramatists and playwrights
19th-century Italian dramatists and playwrights